Big Horn County is a county located in the U.S. state of Montana. As of the 2020 census, the population was 13,124. The county seat is Hardin. The county, like the river and the mountain range, is named after the bighorn sheep in the Rocky Mountains. The county was founded in 1913. It is located on the south line of the state.

Most of the area is part of the Crow Indian Reservation. Reservation poverty affects the county, which is the second-poorest county in the state.

History

Law and government
The county has several jurisdictions, each with its own regulations and law enforcement agencies. The Crow and Northern Cheyenne Indian Nations are administered by the tribes. Little Bighorn Battlefield and the Big Horn Canyon National Recreation Area are regulated by the National Park Service.  The remainder of the county falls under the State of Montana.

Geography
It is the fifth-largest county in Montana by land area. Most of the county's land area is Indian reservations: The Crow Indian Reservation covers 64.2 percent of its area, while the Northern Cheyenne Indian Reservation covers another 6.37 percent.

The county is home to the Big Horn, Pryor and Wolf mountain ranges.

Major highways

  Interstate 90
  U.S. Highway 87
  U.S. Highway 212
  Montana Highway 47
 Montana Highway 313
 Montana Highway 314

Adjacent counties

 Carbon - west
 Yellowstone - northwest
 Treasure - north
 Rosebud - northeast
 Powder River - east
 Sheridan County, Wyoming - south
 Big Horn County, Wyoming - southwest

National protected areas
 Bighorn Canyon National Recreation Area (part)
 Little Bighorn Battlefield National Monument

Climate
According to the Köppen Climate Classification system, Big Horn County has a semi-arid climate, abbreviated "BSk" on climate maps.

Politics
Big Horn County is generally Democratic, owing largely to its majority Native American population. It is distinguished from most other counties in rural Montana, which often lean heavily Republican.

Demographics

2000 census
As of the 2000 United States census, there were 12,671 people, 3,924 households, and 3,033 families living in the county. The population density was 2 people per square mile (1/km2). There were 4,655 housing units at an average density of <1/km2 (1/sq mi). The racial makeup of the county was 36.60% White, 0.04% Black or African American, 59.66% Native American, 0.22% Asian, 0.01% Pacific Islander, 0.68% from other races, and 2.79% from two or more races. 3.67% of the population were Hispanic or Latino of any race. 13.9% were of German ancestry. 67.1% spoke English, 27.9% Crow, 2.5% Cheyenne and 1.3% Spanish as their first language.

There were 3,924 households, out of which 42.40% had children under the age of 18 living with them, 54.00% were married couples living together, 17.60% had a female householder with no husband present, and 22.70% were non-families. 19.30% of all households were made up of individuals, and 6.70% had someone living alone who was 65 years of age or older.  The average household size was 3.17 and the average family size was 3.66.

The county population contained 35.80% under the age of 18, 8.60% from 18 to 24, 26.50% from 25 to 44, 20.50% from 45 to 64, and 8.60% who were 65 years of age or older. The median age was 30 years. For every 100 females there were 97.30 males. For every 100 females age 18 and over, there were 91.00 males.

The median income for a household in the county was $27,684, and the median income for a family was $31,095. Males had a median income of $23,814 versus $18,884 for females. The per capita income for the county was $10,792. About 23.70% of families and 29.20% of the population were below the poverty line, including 37.00% of those under age 18 and 20.10% of those age 65 or over.

2010 census
As of the 2010 United States census, there were 12,865 people, 4,004 households, and 2,970 families living in the county. The racial makeup of the county was 64.3% American Indian, 31.4% white, 0.5% Asian, 0.2% black or African American, 1.0% from other races, and 2.6% from two or more races. Those of Hispanic or Latino origin made up 4.0% of the population. In terms of ancestry, 12.1% were American, and 10.3% were German.

Of the 4,004 households, 45.6% had children under the age of 18 living with them, 48.8% were married couples living together, 17.3% had a female householder with no husband present, 25.8% were non-families, and 23.0% of all households were made up of individuals. The average household size was 3.18 and the average family size was 3.77. The median age was 30.5 years.

The median income for a household in the county was $36,550 and the median income for a family was $41,985. Males had a median income of $32,216 versus $27,917 for females. The per capita income for the county was $15,066. About 20.7% of families and 23.5% of the population were below the poverty line, including 32.4% of those under age 18 and 15.4% of those age 65 or over.

Economy
Coal mining and agriculture play major roles in Big Horn County's economy. Farms and ranches in the county produce mainly beef cattle, sugar beets, alfalfa, and small grains.

Communities

City
 Hardin (county seat)

Town
 Lodge Grass

Census-designated places

 Busby
 Crow Agency
 Fort Smith
 Forty Mile Colony
 Muddy
 Pryor
 St. Xavier
 Wyola

Unincorporated communities

 Aberdeen
 Benteen
 Decker
 Dunmore
 Garryowen
 Kingley
 Toluca

Former communities
 Corinth
 Kirby
 Quietus

See also
 List of lakes of Big Horn County, Montana
 List of mountains in Big Horn County, Montana
 National Register of Historic Places listings in Big Horn County, Montana

References

External links

 Home page

 
1913 establishments in Montana
Populated places established in 1913